The Davidson Glacier is a large valley glacier near Haines, Alaska that finds its source in the Chilkat Range.

History
The Davidson Glacier was named in 1867 for George Davidson. Its Indian name is Ssitkaje. It was recounted by John Muir in his famous travels in and around Glacier Bay in 1879. The glacier was, at that time, a glacier that nearly reached tidewater. It has since receded into the mountains, becoming a valley glacier, and created its very own glacial lake in the glacier's moraine (similar to the Mendenhall Glacier and lake) about one mile inland from the Chilkat Inlet.

Current status
Currently, the Davidson Glacier serves as a tourist attraction for Haines and Skagway.

See also
List of glaciers
Mount Rifenburgh

References

External links

Glaciers of Alaska
Glaciers of Haines Borough, Alaska
Tourist attractions in Haines Borough, Alaska